This is a list of notable Icelandic philosophers:

A
Arnór Hannibalsson

B
Brynjólfur_Bjarnason

G
Guðmundur Finnbogason

H
Hannes Hólmsteinn Gissurarson

J
Jón Ólafsson of Grunnavík

O

Oddný Eir Ævarsdóttir

P
Páll Skúlason

V
Vilhjálmur Árnason

Á

Ágúst H. Bjarnason
Ásta Kristjana Sveinsdóttir

Þ
Þorsteinn Gylfason

 
Philosophers
Iceland